The stress–energy tensor, sometimes called the stress–energy–momentum tensor or the energy–momentum tensor, is a tensor physical quantity that describes the density and flux of energy and momentum in spacetime, generalizing the stress tensor of Newtonian physics. It is an attribute of matter, radiation, and non-gravitational force fields. This density and flux of energy and momentum are the sources of the gravitational field in the Einstein field equations of general relativity, just as mass density is the source of such a field in Newtonian gravity.

Definition
The stress–energy tensor involves the use of superscripted variables (not exponents; see tensor index notation and Einstein summation notation).

The stress–energy tensor is defined as the tensor Tαβ of order two that gives the flux of the αth component of the momentum vector across a surface with constant xβ coordinate. In the theory of relativity, this momentum vector is taken as the four-momentum. In general relativity, the stress–energy tensor is symmetric,

In some alternative theories like Einstein–Cartan theory, the stress–energy tensor may not be perfectly symmetric because of a nonzero spin tensor, which geometrically corresponds to a nonzero torsion tensor.

The components of the stress-energy tensor
Because the stress–energy tensor is of order 2, its components can be displayed in 4 × 4 matrix form:

In the following,  and  range from 1 through 3:

In solid state physics and fluid mechanics, the stress tensor is defined to be the spatial components of the stress–energy tensor in the proper frame of reference. In other words, the stress–energy tensor in engineering differs from the relativistic stress–energy tensor by a momentum-convective term.

Covariant and mixed forms
Most of this article works with the contravariant form,  of the stress–energy tensor. However, it is often necessary to work with the covariant form,

or the mixed form,

or as a mixed tensor density

This article uses the spacelike sign convention (−+++) for the metric signature.

Conservation law

In special relativity

The stress–energy tensor is the conserved Noether current associated with spacetime translations.

The divergence of the non-gravitational stress–energy is zero. In other words, non-gravitational energy and momentum are conserved,

When gravity is negligible and using a Cartesian coordinate system for spacetime, this may be expressed in terms of partial derivatives as 

The integral form of this is

In flat spacetime and using Cartesian coordinates, if one combines this with the symmetry of the stress–energy tensor, one can show that angular momentum is also conserved:

In general relativity
When gravity is non-negligible or when using arbitrary coordinate systems, the divergence of the stress–energy still vanishes. But in this case,  a coordinate-free definition of the divergence is used which incorporates the covariant derivative

where  is the Christoffel symbol which is the gravitational force field.

Consequently, if  is any Killing vector field, then the conservation law associated with the symmetry generated by the Killing vector field may be expressed as

The integral form of this is

In special relativity
In special relativity, the stress–energy tensor contains information about the energy and momentum densities of a given system, in addition to the momentum and energy flux densities.

Given a Lagrangian Density  that is a function of a set of fields  and their derivatives, but explicitly not of any of the spacetime coordinates, we can construct the tensor by looking at the total derivative with respect to one of the generalized coordinates of the system. So, with our condition

By using the chain rule, we then have

Written in useful shorthand,

Then, we can use the Euler–Lagrange Equation:

And then use the fact that partial derivatives commute so that we now have

We can recognize the right hand side as a product rule. Writing it as the derivative of a product of functions tells us that

Now, in flat space, one can write . Doing this and moving it to the other side of the equation tells us that

And upon regrouping terms,

This is to say that the divergence of the tensor in the brackets is 0. Indeed, with this, we define the stress–energy tensor:

By construction it has the property that

Note that this divergenceless property of this tensor is equivalent to four continuity equations. That is, fields have at least four sets of quantities that obey the continuity equation. As an example, it can be seen that  is the energy density of the system and that it is thus possible to obtain the Hamiltonian density from the stress–energy tensor.

Indeed, since this is the case, observing that , we then have

We can then conclude that the terms of  represent the energy flux density of the system.

Trace
Note that the trace of the stress–energy tensor is defined to be , where

When we use the formula for the stress–energy tensor found above,

Using the raising and lowering properties of the metric and that ,

Since ,

In general relativity
In general relativity, the symmetric stress–energy tensor acts as the source of spacetime curvature, and is the current density associated with gauge transformations of gravity which are general curvilinear coordinate transformations. (If there is torsion, then the tensor is no longer symmetric. This corresponds to the case with a nonzero spin tensor in Einstein–Cartan gravity theory.)

In general relativity, the partial derivatives used in special relativity are replaced by covariant derivatives. What this means is that the continuity equation no longer implies that the non-gravitational energy and momentum expressed by the tensor are absolutely conserved, i.e. the gravitational field can do work on matter and vice versa. In the classical limit of Newtonian gravity, this has a simple interpretation: kinetic energy is being exchanged with gravitational potential energy, which is not included in the tensor, and momentum is being transferred through the field to other bodies. In general relativity the Landau–Lifshitz pseudotensor is a unique way to define the gravitational field energy and momentum densities. Any such stress–energy pseudotensor can be made to vanish locally by a coordinate transformation.

In curved spacetime, the spacelike integral now depends on the spacelike slice, in general. There is in fact no way to define a global energy–momentum vector in a general curved spacetime.

Einstein field equations

In general relativity, the stress-energy tensor is studied in the context of the Einstein field equations which are often written as

Stress–energy in special situations

Isolated particle
In special relativity, the stress–energy of a non-interacting particle with rest mass m and trajectory  is:

where  is the velocity vector (which should not be confused with four-velocity, since it is missing a )

Written in language of classical physics, the stress-energy tensor would be (relativistic mass, momentum, the dyadic product of momentum and velocity) 
.

Stress–energy of a fluid in equilibrium
For a perfect fluid in thermodynamic equilibrium, the stress–energy tensor takes on a particularly simple form

Therefore, the trace is given by

The four-velocity satisfies

In an inertial frame of reference comoving with the fluid, better known as the fluid's proper frame of reference, the four-velocity is 

the matrix inverse of the metric tensor is simply

and the stress–energy tensor is a diagonal matrix

Electromagnetic stress–energy tensor

The Hilbert stress–energy tensor of a source-free electromagnetic field is

where  is the electromagnetic field tensor.

Scalar field

The stress–energy tensor for a complex scalar field  that satisfies the Klein–Gordon equation is

and when the metric is flat (Minkowski in Cartesian coordinates) its components work out to be:

Variant definitions of stress–energy
There are a number of inequivalent definitions of non-gravitational stress–energy:

Hilbert stress–energy tensor
The Hilbert stress–energy tensor is defined as the functional derivative

where  is the nongravitational part of the action,  is the nongravitational part of the Lagrangian density, and the Euler-Lagrange equation has been used. This is symmetric and gauge-invariant. See Einstein–Hilbert action for more information.

Canonical stress–energy tensor
Noether's theorem implies that there is a conserved current associated with translations through space and time. This is called the canonical stress–energy tensor. Generally, this is not symmetric and if we have some gauge theory, it may not be gauge invariant because space-dependent gauge transformations do not commute with spatial translations.

In general relativity, the translations are with respect to the coordinate system and as such, do not transform covariantly. See the section below on the gravitational stress–energy pseudo-tensor.

Belinfante–Rosenfeld stress–energy tensor

In the presence of spin or other intrinsic angular momentum, the canonical Noether stress–energy tensor fails to be symmetric. The Belinfante–Rosenfeld stress–energy tensor is constructed from the canonical stress–energy tensor and the spin current in such a way as to be symmetric and still conserved. In general relativity, this modified tensor agrees with the Hilbert stress–energy tensor.

Gravitational stress–energy

By the equivalence principle gravitational stress–energy will always vanish locally at any chosen point in some chosen frame, therefore gravitational stress–energy cannot be expressed as a non-zero tensor; instead we have to use a pseudotensor.

In general relativity, there are many possible distinct definitions of the gravitational stress–energy–momentum pseudotensor. These include the Einstein pseudotensor and the Landau–Lifshitz pseudotensor. The Landau–Lifshitz pseudotensor can be reduced to zero at any event in spacetime by choosing an appropriate coordinate system.

See also

Electromagnetic stress–energy tensor
Energy condition
Energy density of electric and magnetic fields
Maxwell stress tensor
Poynting vector
Ricci calculus
Segre classification

Notes and references

External links
 Lecture, Stephan Waner
 Caltech Tutorial on Relativity — A simple discussion of the relation between the Stress–Energy tensor of General Relativity and the metric

Tensor physical quantities
Density